Kenneth Hlasa (born 2 March 1955) is a Lesotho long-distance runner. He competed in the marathon and in the men's 800 metres at the 1980 Summer Olympics in Moscow.

References

1955 births
Living people
Athletes (track and field) at the 1980 Summer Olympics
Lesotho male long-distance runners
Lesotho male marathon runners
Olympic athletes of Lesotho
Athletes (track and field) at the 1978 Commonwealth Games
Athletes (track and field) at the 1986 Commonwealth Games
Commonwealth Games competitors for Lesotho
Place of birth missing (living people)